Allan Knee is an American film and television writer and playwright who authored the following:

Stage
Little Women (Broadway musical) (2005)
The Man Who was Peter Pan (42nd Street Workshop 'Off-Broadway. (March 1998)
Late Nite Comic (Broadway) (1987)
Santa Anita '42 (Off-Broadway) (1974)

Film/TV
Esther's Diary (2010), a Holocaust film directed by Mariusz Kotowski
Finding Neverland (2004) (screenplay by David Magee was based on Knee's play, The Man Who Was Peter Pan)
The Scarlet Letter (1979) (mini-series)

References

External links

Film freak central

Year of birth missing (living people)
American dramatists and playwrights
American musical theatre librettists
Living people